Presidential elections were held in Kiribati on 27 November 1998. The result was a victory for incumbent Teburoro Tito, who won 52.3% of the vote.

Results

References

Kiribati
1998 in Kiribati
Presidential elections in Kiribati
Election and referendum articles with incomplete results